Nikola Radovanović (born 13 March 2003) is a Serbian professional basketball player for Partizan Belgrade of the Adriatic League, on a loan to Mladost Zemun of the Basketball League of Serbia (KLS).

Early career 
Radovanović started to play basketball in his hometown team Velež. In 2015, he joined Budućnost from Bijeljina. As 15-years-old, Radovanović played for Budućnost Bijeljina in the R Srpska First League during the 2018–19 season, averaging 18 points per game. In January 2019, Radovanović moved to Belgrade, Serbia joining the youth system of Partizan NIS. Afterward, Budućnost accused Partizan for "stealing" of their young prospect Radovanović. Radovanović played for the Partizan U19 team in the 2019–20 Junior ABA League on all five games, averaging 14.6 points, 6.2 rebounds and 1.2 assists per game. In summer 2020, Radovanović was loaned to Slodes for the 2020–21 Serbian Second League. Over six games, he averaged 3.5 points and 5.7 rebounds per game.

Professional career 
In February 2021, Radovanović was added to the Partizan NIS roster for the rest of the 2020–21 season. On 27 February, he made his professional debut in a 96–94 loss to Zadar, recording 3 points and two rebounds in 12 minutes of playing time. On 10 March, Radovanović appeared for 12 seconds in a 75–70 loss to Metropolitans 92, making his EuroCup debut without a record. In September 2021, he joined Dunav as a two-affiliate player. In November 2022, he was loaned to Mladost Zemun.

National team career
Radovanović was a member of the Serbian under-16 national team that participated at the 2019 FIBA U16 European Championship in Udine, Italy. Over seven tournament games, he averaged 15.1 points, 7.3 rebounds and 1.3 assists per game.

References

External links 
 Profile at serbiahoop.com
 Profile at ABA League
 Profile at realgm.com

2003 births
Living people
ABA League players
Basketball League of Serbia players
Bosnia and Herzegovina expatriate basketball people in Serbia
Bosnia and Herzegovina men's basketball players
OKK Dunav players
KK Partizan players
KK Slodes players
Small forwards
Serbian expatriate basketball people in Bosnia and Herzegovina
Serbian men's basketball players
Serbs of Bosnia and Herzegovina
Sportspeople from Nevesinje